Coastal trading vessels, also known as coasters or skoots, are shallow-hulled ships used for trade between locations on the same island or continent. Their shallow hulls mean that they can get through reefs where deeper-hulled seagoing ships usually cannot, but as a result they are not optimized for the large waves found on the open ocean. Coasters can load and unload cargo in shallow ports.

World War II

During World War II there was a demand for coasters to support troops around the world. Type N3 ship and Type C1 ship was the designation for small cargo ships built for the United States Maritime Commission before and during World War II.  Both were use for close to shore and short cargo runs. Government of the United Kingdom used Empire ships type Empire F as a merchant ship for coastal shipping. UK seamen called these "CHANTs", possibly because they had the same hull form as Channel Tankers (CHANT) and initially all the tankers were sold to foreign owners and therefore there was no conflict in nomenclature. The USA and UK both used coastal tankers also. UK used Empire coaster tankers and T1 tankers. Many coasters had some armament like: a 5-inch (127 mm) stern gun, 3-inch (76.2 mm) bow anti-aircraft gun and Oerlikon 20 mm anti-aircraft gun. Armament was removed after the war. After the war many of the ships were sold to private companies all around the world.

See also
 Short sea shipping

References

External links

Historia y Arqueología Marítima - Los buques cargueros tipo N3 (Spanish, with diagram & photos
The Bay of Pigs Invasion-The sinking of the Houston (photos)
(N3-M-A1 variant) Shipscribe: ENCELADUS (AK-80)
 (N3-M-A1 variant) Shipscribe: BAK-1 (S.S. Asa Lothrop)
Ships of the U.S. Navy, 1940-1945

Merchant ships